Jezfatan may refer to:
 Jezfatan-e Olya
 Jezfatan-e Sofla